This is a list of female judges of the Supreme Court of India, the highest court in the Republic of India. The list is ordered according to chronology.

The first female justice in the court was Fathima Beevi appointed on 6 October 1989. There have been 11 female justices in the court since then. Presently there is 3 sitting female judges out of the total 34 judges (including Chief Justice of India) in the court.

List of Judges in chronology
Key
  Incumbent Judge

See also
List of female governors and lieutenant governors in India
List of female chief ministers in India
List of chief justices of India
List of sitting judges of the Supreme Court of India
List of former judges of the Supreme Court of India
List of first women lawyers and judges in Asia

References

Judges,Female
Judiciary of India
List
Supreme Court of India,Female
Lists of women by occupation and nationality